Adbhar (historically Ashtadwar) is a historical town and a nagar panchayat in Sakti district in the state of Chhattisgarh in India.

History
Thirteen photos from the town have been preserved at British Library. Ancient copper plates issued by a historical king NannaRaja  from capital of Sirpur, dating back to the 7th century  have been collected from the town. Four books of exact sciences in Sanskrit have been collected by an American mathematician David Pingree from this town indicating the town's intellectual and social role since ancient times. Apart from that the town has also remains of Jain and Buddhist cultures, a number of Shiva lingas, large numbers of lakes (and ponds) which used to be 126 in numbers as believed locally, remains of moat of ancient kings and a lake (pond) with endangered species of giant sized Leatherback freshwater Turtle.

Demographics
As per 2011 census, the town had population of 7,272 of which 3,572 are males while 3,700 are females. Population of Children with age of 0-6 is 897 which is 12.33% of total population. Female Sex Ratio is of 1036 against state average of 991. Moreover, Child Sex Ratio in Adbhar is around 1039 compared to Chhattisgarh state average of 969.Literacy rate  is 73.74% higher than state average of 70.28% with Male literacy around 82.31% while female literacy rate is 65.46%.Schedule Caste (SC) constitutes 24.71% while Schedule Tribe (ST) were 11.01% of total population. The population includes majority of Hindu population while Muslims and Christians are minority and very few in numbers.

Temples
The Ashtabhuji Temple of the town (historically a Shiva temple) is considered to be one of the great Shaktipeethas of Goddess Durga with a rare life sized idol of Goddess Ashtabhuji  and which is in good condition.

Transport
The town is well connected at a distance of 10 km south-east from Sakti railway station of Howrah–Nagpur–Mumbai line and 10 km south-west from Kharsiya railway station in the same railway line and 10 km from National Highway 200 at Sakti. Nearest domestic airport is Raipur airport at a distance of 200 km.

References

Cities and towns in Janjgir-Champa district